was the second vessel in the  of medium-sized minelayers of the Imperial Japanese Navy, which was in service during World War II. She was designed as an improved version of the netlayer . However, during the Pacific War, due to the critical shortage of patrol ships for convoy escort duties, she was fitted with depth charge racks and her minelaying rails were removed.

Building
Under the Maru-3 Supplemental Armaments Budget of 1937, the Imperial Japanese Navy authorized a two vessels of a new class of minelayer (Project number H12) primarily for coastal duties. The new vessel was designed to carry either 100 Type 5 naval mines, or to function as a netlayer based on design features developed through operational experience with Shirataka.

Aotaka was launched by the Harima Shipyard near Kobe on February 3, 1940, and was commissioned into service on June 30, 1940.

Operational history
After commissioning, Aotaka was assigned to the Maizuru Naval District, but was soon reassigned to become flagship of the First Second Base Force of the IJN 2nd Fleet. On March 23, 1941, she was assigned to patrols of the central China coastline. On April 10, 1941, Aotaka was reassigned to the IJN 3rd Fleet, and continued its deployment on the China coast through the end of November.

At the time of the Attack on Pearl Harbor in December 1941, Aotaka was assigned to "Operation M", (the invasion of the northern Philippines), escorting several convoys of transports between the Japanese home islands, Palau and landing zones in the Philippines.

In January 1942, Aotaka was assigned to ”Operation H” (the invasion of the Celebes in the Netherlands East Indies), supporting landings at Kendari and Makassar, and later supporting ”Operation J”, the invasion Java and Bali. On March 10, Aotaka was reassigned to the Second Southern Expeditionary Fleet, spending much of the rest of the year escorting convoys between Surabaya, and Singapore, from its base at Makassar.

In January 1943,  Aotaka escorted the damaged  from Ambon to Makassar for repairs, and unsuccessfully attacked the submarine  with depth charges on January 23.  Aotaka continued with escort and patrol operations between Makassar, Singapore and Surabaya until reassigned to the Southwest Area Fleet on July 30, when her zone of operations was shifted to Halmahera Island, the Moluccas and Makassar to mid-1944. On May 16, she suffered minor damage after striking a magnetic mine at Halmahera.

On June 3, Aotaka departed Singapore with a convoy bound for Moji, Kitakyūshū. On September 1, Aotaka escorted a convoy from Mako to Manila. After arriving safely, on September 21, approximately 200 aircraft from United States Navy Task Force 38 raided Manila Bay; however, Aotaka avoided any damage. Aotaka then escorted a large convoy from Manila Bay to the presumed safety of Coron Bay at Busuanga Island, Palawan on September 23.

Aotaka was removed from the navy list on 10 November 1944.

References

Notes

Books

External links

Minelayers of the Imperial Japanese Navy
World War II mine warfare vessels of Japan
Ships built by IHI Corporation
Ships sunk by American submarines
1940 ships
Maritime incidents in September 1944
World War II shipwrecks in the South China Sea